Don Patterson (born October 31, 1957) is a former professional American football player who played defensive back for two seasons for the  Detroit Lions and New York Giants

His sons, Eric Patterson and Corey Patterson are both former Major League Baseball outfielders. Eric played for the Chicago Cubs, Oakland Athletics, Boston Red Sox, and the San Diego Padres. Corey played for the Cubs, Baltimore Orioles, Cincinnati Reds, Washington Nationals, Milwaukee Brewers, Toronto Blue Jays, and the St. Louis Cardinals.

References

1957 births
American football safeties
American football cornerbacks
Detroit Lions players
New York Giants players
Georgia Tech Yellow Jackets football players
Living people